The 30th Blue Dragon Film Awards ceremony was held on December 2, 2009 at the KBS Hall in Yeouido, Seoul, South Korea. Hosted by actors Kim Hye-soo and Lee Beom-soo, it was presented by Sports Chosun and was broadcast on KBS starting at 8PM KST.

Nominations and winners
Complete list of nominees and winners:

(Winners denoted in bold)

References

2009 film awards
Blue Dragon Film Awards
2009 in South Korean cinema